Oluwaseun A. Aderogba is the Anglican Bishop of Jebba in Kwara Province  of the Church of Nigeria.

He was elected Bishop of Jebba in January 2019, and consecrated in April 2019 at St David's Anglican Cathedral Church, Ijomu, Akure, by the Primate of All Nigeria, Nicholas Okoh. He was previously an archdeacon.

References 

Anglican bishops of Jebba
21st-century Anglican bishops in Nigeria
Nigerian Anglicans
Church of Nigeria archdeacons
Year of birth missing (living people)
Living people